Radojka Adžić (born 21 May 1976), better known as Dara Bubamara, is a Serbian singer from Novi Sad. Before pursuing a solo career in 1995, she had gained initial prominence as a member of Dara Bubamara Show band. Dara has released twelve studio albums.

Early life
Radojka Adžić was born on 21 May 1976 in Novi Sad, SFR Yugoslavia. She comes from a working class background. Adžić showed interest in music from an early age, appearing on popular children's variety shows. As a child, Dara also opened for singer Lepa Lukić at her concert in Zrenjanin. Furthermore, Adžić stated that she took home the first prize at the Zmaj Children Games. According to the media, she dropped out from high school, but Adžić claims otherwise.

Career
Adžić began her career as a member of the Vojvodina-based Dara Bubamara Show band, from which she got her stage name. They released one studio album, titled Košava sa Dunava, in 1993. Dara pursued a solo career with her debut album Dosada, which was released under PGP-RTS in 1995. In the following years, she released three more albums under ZaM, featuring stand-out songs "Ja neću da ga vidim" and "Svi su tu kao nekada". Her self-titled fifth album was released in 2001 through Best Records.

In 2003, she released Polje jagoda under Grand Production. Bubamara subsequently released two more albums under the label - Bez milosti (2005) and Dodirni me (2007). The latter was sold in 150,000 copies, making it one of her most successful releases. During her time in Grand, Adžić gained significant popularity with the hit songs "Polje jagoda", "Vero nevero", "Javite mi, javite", "Dodirni me" and "Zidovi". In 2009, it was reported that Dara alongside several other singers had been dropped from Grand Production.

In September 2010, Adžić promoted album Sangrija, released under K::CN Records. The following album, titled Dara 2013, was released through City Records in April 2013. It was preceded by the singles "Galama" (2011) and "Delete" (2012). During the 2014, Adžić started working with prominent rappers and record producers, Stefan Đurić Rasta and Slobodan Veljković Coby, releasing three standalone singles: "Opasan", "Kraj i tačka" and "Karera", which all saw commercial success. Dara then competed on the second Pink Music Festival in May 2015 with the song "Žena zmaj", receiving the Audience Award. In March 2016, she was announced as a contestant on the third season of the reality competition show Tvoje lice zvuči poznato, where she placed 8th. Later that year she also became a judge on the televised singing contest Pinkove Zvezde. In May 2017, Dara released her twelfth studio album, called Biografija. In April the following year, she held a concert in the Belgrade Arena to 15,000 people, celebrating close to thirty years of career. On stage she was joined by Jelena Karleuša as the guest performer for the song "Galama". In October 2018, Dara released the single "All Inclusive".

Personal life
Dara's first marriage was to Lazar Dugalić in 2002, which lasted for five years. During their relationship, Dugalić was arrested  for car theft in Germany.

In 2008, Adžić married Serbian-born French businessman, Milan Kesić. The couple welcomed their son Konstantin on 2 January 2009. In December 2015, she was caught up in a media scandal when nude photos of her were leaked to the tabloids, which also provoked accusations of her adultery. After months of speculations, in September 2016, Dara stated that Kesić and har had not been married for a year.

Discography
Solo albums
Dosada (1995)
Dara Bubamara (1996)
Dunav (1997)
Dara (1999)
Dvojnica (2001)
Dara Bubamara (2003)
Polje jagoda (2003)
Bez milosti (2005)
Dodirni me (2007)
Sangrija (2010)
Dara 2013 (2013)
Biografija (2017)

Filmography

References

External links
 
 

1976 births
Living people
Musicians from Novi Sad
21st-century Serbian women singers
Serbian people of Bosnia and Herzegovina descent
Grand Production artists
Serbian folk-pop singers
20th-century Serbian women singers